The Lamartine is a 19th-century shipwreck lying in the waters of the Stellwagen Bank National Marine Sanctuary, off Gloucester, Massachusetts.  She was a schooner built in 1848 in Camden, Maine.  She was hauling quarried granite from Stonington, Maine to New York City when she went down in a storm on May 17, 1893.  One crewmember drowned; the others were rescued by a fishing vessel that saw the ship sinking.  The wreck was located in 2004 by a survey team, documented over the next two years.

The wreck was listed on the National Register of Historic Places in 2012.

See also
National Register of Historic Places listings in Gloucester, Massachusetts
National Register of Historic Places listings in Essex County, Massachusetts

References

National Register of Historic Places in Essex County, Massachusetts
Shipwrecks on the National Register of Historic Places in Massachusetts
Buildings and structures in Gloucester, Massachusetts